John Kelleher (12 November 1901 – 23 December 1972) was an Irish boxer. He competed in the men's lightweight event at the 1924 Summer Olympics.

References

External links
 

1901 births
1972 deaths
Irish male boxers
Olympic boxers of Ireland
Boxers at the 1924 Summer Olympics
Place of birth missing
Lightweight boxers